The Dark Tower: The Gunslinger - The Man in Black is a five-issue comic book limited series published by Marvel Comics. It is the tenth comic book miniseries based on Stephen King's The Dark Tower series of novels. It is plotted by Robin Furth, scripted by Peter David, and illustrated by Alex Maleev and Richard Isanove. Stephen King is the Creative and Executive Director of the project. The first issue was published on June 20, 2012.

Publication dates
Issue #1: June 20, 2012
Issue #2: July 18, 2012
Issue #3: August 15, 2012
Issue #4: September 19, 2012
Issue #5: October 17, 2012

Collected editions
The entire five-issue run of The Man in Black was collected into a hardcover edition, released by Marvel on January 15, 2013. A paperback edition was later released on October 29, 2013. The series was also included in the hardcover release of The Dark Tower: The Gunslinger Omnibus on September 3, 2014.

See also
The Dark Tower (comics)

References

External links

Dark Tower Official Site

2012 comics debuts
Gunslinger - Man in Black, The